The 2nd World Championships in Athletics under the auspices of the International Association of Athletics Federations were held in the Stadio Olimpico in Rome, Italy between August 28 and September 6, 1987.

Men's results

Track

1983 | 1987 | 1991 | 1993 | 1995

1 Ben Johnson of Canada originally won the gold medal in 9.83, but he was disqualified in September 1989 after he admitted to using steroids between 1981 and 1988.
* Indicates athletes who ran in preliminary rounds.

Field
1983 | 1987 | 1991 | 1993 | 1995

1 Giovanni Evangelisti of Italy originally won the bronze medal with 8.37 m, but it was later determined that Italian field officials had entered a pre-arranged fake result for a jump of 7.85 m. . While Evangelisti had no involvement in or knowledge of the fraud,  Italian head coach Sandro Donati, who revealed it, was fired.

Women's results

Track
1983 | 1987 | 1991 | 1993 | 1995

Note: * Indicates athletes who ran in preliminary rounds.

Field
1983 | 1987 | 1991 | 1993 | 1995

Exhibition events
Two exhibition para-athletics events appeared at the competition, but results did not go towards the overall medal count. The two wheelchair races were the first time disability events had appeared at the championships, and were the first exhibition event of any kind to feature at the World Championships in Athletics. This began a tradition of such events which continued until 2011. Wheelchair exhibition events were contested until that year, bar 1999 and 2009.

Medal table

See also
 1987 in athletics (track and field)

References

 IAAF 1987
 Results

 
World Athletics Championships
World
Sports competitions in Rome
International athletics competitions hosted by Italy
World Championships in Athletics
World Championships in Athletics
World Championships in Athletics
1980s in Rome
Athletics in Rome